The North Shore Mountains are a mountain range overlooking Vancouver in British Columbia, Canada. Their southernmost peaks are visible from most areas in Vancouver and form a distinctive backdrop for the city.

The steep southern slopes of the North Shore Mountains limit the extent to which the mainland municipalities of Greater Vancouver's North Shore (West Vancouver, the District of North Vancouver, the City of North Vancouver and the Village of Lions Bay) can grow. In many places on the North Shore, residential neighbourhoods abruptly end and rugged forested slopes begin. These forested slopes are crisscrossed by a large network of trails including the Baden-Powell Trail, the Howe Sound Crest Trail, the Binkert/Lions Trail and a wide variety of mountain biking trails.

The North Shore Mountains are a small subrange of the Pacific Ranges, the southernmost grouping of the vast Coast Mountains. They are bounded on the south by Burrard Inlet, on the west and north-west by Howe Sound, and on the north and north-east by the Garibaldi Ranges. To the east the bounds are defined by Indian Arm (a branch of Burrard Inlet). The ridge running north from Mount Seymour has its own name, the Fannin Range, while the bulk of the range and most of the Howe Sound-flanking portion of it is officially known as the Britannia Range.

Although not particularly high, these mountains are rugged and should not be underestimated. Severe weather conditions in the North Shore Mountains often contrast dramatically with mild conditions in nearby Vancouver. This is especially true in winter, but even in summer, large precipices are hidden very close to popular hiking trails and it is very easy to get lost, despite being in sight of the city. Those who venture into the North Shore Mountains for whatever reason should be well prepared at any time of year.

Three deep valleys divide the North Shore Mountains. These are, in order from west to east:
 Capilano River valley
 Lynn Headwaters
 Lynn Valley
 Seymour River valley

The Capilano and Seymour rivers emanate from the massive GVRD watershed area. The watershed extends deep into the North Shore Mountains region, but is strictly off-limits to all unauthorized human activities. The Lynn Headwaters, a deep cirque valley drained by Lynn Creek, is no longer part of the GVRD watershed and is now a very popular regional park.

There are two provincial parks in the area, Cypress Provincial Park and Mount Seymour Provincial Park. Both feature reliable road access, downhill ski areas, and extensive trail networks. Nearby Grouse Mountain features a downhill ski area and tourist attractions which are accessible by the Skyride, an aerial tramway. A very popular hiking trail, the Grouse Grind, climbs up the steep flanks of Grouse Mountain from the tramway parking lot. Before the Grouse Mountain Skyride was built, a chairlift operated from Skyline Drive at the head of North Vancouver's Lonsdale Avenue, and the ski area itself could be accessed via Mountain Highway, which now has a gate at its upper end in the Lynn Valley neighbourhood.

In the Seymour valley, a paved access road called the Seymour Trailway winds for many kilometres into the mountains. It is frequently used for recreation, and occasionally for TV and film productions such as Stargate SG-1.

Mountains 

There are dozens of individual mountains in the North Shore Mountains. The list below is incomplete.

Britannia Range 
Sky Pilot Mountain
Mount Habrich
Mount Hanover
Deeks Peak

Cypress group 
 Black MountainA forested summit overlooking Horseshoe Bay. Ski runs on the northern slopes are managed by Cypress Mountain Resort.
 Hollyburn MountainA popular hiking destination.  Commonly known as Hollyburn Ridge and the location of an old alpine recreation community dating back to the early years of the 20th Century. It is the site of the only groomed cross-country ski trails in the Lower Mainland.
 Mount StrachanSki runs on the southern slopes are managed by Cypress Mountain Resort.

Grouse area 
 Mount FrommeA large forested summit dome, often seen but seldom visited. This mountain is noted for the mountain biking trails on its south slopes.
 Grouse MountainSite of a very popular ski area, and the popular hiking trail Grouse Grind.
 Dam MountainLocated directly west of Grouse Mountain with the hike from the Grouse lodge referred to as the "Snowshoe Grind".
 Goat MountainAnother popular alpine hiking destination, very conveniently located near the top of the Grouse Mountain aerial tramway.
 Crown MountainAn exposed granite pyramid ringed by sheer cliffs.

Cathedral/Lynn range 
 Lynn PeakA small forested mountain, nevertheless a popular hiking destination due to ease of access.
 The NeedlesAn isolated series of ridge-top summits north of Lynn Peak.
 Coliseum MountainA remote alpine area consisting of a series of gentle granite exposures.
 Mount BurwellA remote granite dome located at the limit of legal backcountry access.
 Cathedral MountainAmong the tallest and most prominent of the North Shore Mountains, but off-limits due to its location within the Greater Vancouver watershed.

Fannin Range 
 Mount SeymourGood trails and convenient access by road make Seymour a local classic hiking area.  Downhill ski area in winter.
 Mount ElsayA remote backcountry peak located beyond Seymour.
 Mount BishopA rarely climbed peak in the remote northern region of Mt. Seymour Provincial Park.

Lions area 
 The LionsProbably the most famous peaks in the North Shore Mountains. These mountains, a pair of twin granite domes, are visually distinctive and can be seen from much of the Greater Vancouver area.
 Mount HarveyAn isolated alpine peak located near the Lions.
 Brunswick MountainThe highest of the North Shore Mountains, located north of Mount Harvey.
 Capilano Mountaineast of the headwaters of the Capilano River

See also 
 Geography of British Columbia
 Mountains of British Columbia
 North Shore (Greater Vancouver)

References

External links 

 North Shore Rescue

 
Pacific Ranges
Mountain ranges of British Columbia
North Vancouver (district municipality)
West Vancouver
Landforms of Vancouver